Eugène Vanel was a 19th-century French playwright, journalist and writer.

Director of the Mandataire, journal des employés et des administrations and of L'Intervention universelle (1849) then of the political newspaper the Frondeur, he was sentenced in 1845 to one month in prison and 200 francs fine for "Having treated of political matters without first filing a bond".

Author of polemical works, his plays were presented among others at the Théâtre du Panthéon and the Théâtre de la Porte-Saint-Martin.

In 1869–70, he directed the Journal de la parfumerie.

Works 
1838: 19 coups de canon ! ! !, À propos in 1 act mingled with couplets
1839: Les Belles femmes de Paris, comédie en vaudeville in 1 act, with Ange-Jean-Robert Eustache Angel
1840: La Chambre des députés, satire en vers à l'occasion de la translation des cendres de Napoléon
1840: Deux Secrets, one-act drama, mingled with couplets
1840: La Colonne de Juillet, chant patriotique sur l'air du Chant du départ
1840: L'Ombre de Napoléon, ou l'Arrivée de ses cendres, chant national sur l'air de la Marseillaise
1841: Le roi d'Yvetot, légende historique et burlesque
1841: Histoire populaire de tous les théâtres de Paris
1841: Histoire de la censure
1843: Pendu ou fusillé !, comedy mingled with singing, with Ernest Brisson
1844: Le 12 et le 13 juillet
1853: À Napoléon III, le tombeau de l'anarchie
1856: À l'enfant de France, naissance et Te Deume

References

External links 
 List of his plays on data.bnf.fr

19th-century French journalists
French male journalists
19th-century French dramatists and playwrights
19th-century French male writers